Baslow and Bubnell is a civil parish in the Derbyshire Dales district of Derbyshire, England.  The parish contains 30 listed buildings that are recorded in the National Heritage List for England.  Of these, one is listed at Grade I, the highest of the three grades, one is at Grade II*, the middle grade, and the others are at Grade II, the lowest grade.  The parish contains the villages of Baslow and Bubnell, and the surrounding countryside and moorland.  Most of the listed buildings are houses, cottages and associated structures.  The other listed buildings include a church and items in the churchyard, bridges, including a clapper bridge, a hotel, guide posts and guide stones, mile posts and a milestone, a boundary stone, a monument, and a telephone kiosk.


Key

Buildings

References

Citations

Sources

 

Lists of listed buildings in Derbyshire